"Heartless" is a song by American rapper Polo G, released on September 20, 2019 by Columbia Records. The song features American record producer Mustard, who produced the track, and is the lead single from Polo G's second studio album The Goat (2020).

Composition
The song features a guitar loop, as well as an uptempo "trap-dipped blues rhythm". It finds Polo G singing about his past struggles, including that of his family and his activities in the streets, his rise to success, and staying true to his roots.

Music video
A music video directed by Ryan Lynch was released alongside the single. It sees Polo G in Chicago with his friends as he raps, while "glitchy graphics, fire strips, and lyrics" appear around him.

In April 2022, after the video had passed 100 million views on YouTube, Polo G revealed on Instagram that he almost died of a drug overdose before the video shoot.

Charts

Certifications

References

2019 singles
2019 songs
Polo G songs
Song recordings produced by Mustard (record producer)
Songs written by Polo G
Songs written by Mustard (record producer)
Columbia Records singles